Botanical gardens in Estonia have collections consisting entirely of Estonia native and endemic species; most have a collection that include plants from around the world. There are botanical gardens and arboreta in all states and territories of Estonia, most are administered by local governments, some are privately owned.

 Tallinn Botanic Garden
 University of Tartu Botanical Gardens

References 

Estonia
Botanical gardens